We Are The Dogs is an extended play from London-based band Dogs, released in June 2010.

Track listing 
 "Cost of Loving" (3:19)
 "This Sorry Scene" (3:41)
 "The Floor Fell Away" (3:54)
 "Long Walk Home" (3:54)
 "When I Threw Stones" (4:38)
 "Now The Rain Falls" (2:22)

References

2010 EPs